Caleb Williams is an American football player. 

Caleb Williams may also refer to:

Caleb Williams, the shortened title and the name of the protagonist of Things as They Are; or, The Adventures of Caleb Williams, a 1794 British novel
Caleb Williams Saleeby (1878–1940), English physician